Paatal Lok
is an Indian Hindi-language crime thriller web television series on Amazon Prime Video, created by Sudip Sharma, who wrote the script along with Sagar Haveli, Hardik Mehta and Gunjit Chopra, and directed by Avinash Arun and Prosit Roy. The series was produced by Anushka Sharma, under the banner Clean Slate Filmz, and stars Jaideep Ahlawat, Gul Panag, Neeraj Kabi, Swastika Mukherjee, Ishwak Singh, and Abhishek Banerjee. Loosely based on Tarun Tejpal's 2010 novel The Story of My Assassins, the series is about a disillusioned cop who lands the case of an assassination attempt gone wrong.

Sudip Sharma wrote the script in January 2017, and took more than a year for writing and pre-production. It is filmed across more than 110 real locations, with Paatal Lok being the first web series to be shot at Chitrakoot. The cinematography for the series were handled by Avinash Arun and Saurabh Goswami, with editing done by Sanyukta Kaza. The background score was jointly composed by Naren Chandravarkar and Benedict Taylor. The series marked the debut of Clean Slate Filmz (a production house led by Anushka Sharma) in production of television series for the digital medium.

Paatal Lok was premiered on Amazon Prime Video on 15 May 2020. The series received rave reviews from critics, praising the performances, storyline, writing and direction.  The series were listed in the Top 10 Indian Web Series of 2020, by The Indian Express. Variety listed Paatal Lok as one of the best international TV shows of 2020.

Paatal Lok received eight nominations at the inaugural Filmfare OTT Awards, and won five awards – Best Actor (Jaideep Ahlawat), Best Series, Best Original Story, Best Screenplay and Best Direction (Avinash Arun and Prosit Roy). In May 2020, the makers announced that the second season is to be conceptualized. On April 28, 2022 Amazon Prime announced that it has renewed the show for its second season.

Synopsis 
The show revolves around Hathiram Chowdhary (Jaideep Ahlawat) a cynical cop who gets assigned to investigate a high-profile case. As he gets caught in the investigation, he gets dragged into the darker realms of the underworld. Paatal Lok is inspired by traditional concepts of Svarga, Dharti and Paatal (heaven, earth and the hell), as metaphors for the different classes of India and the four estates, with the Paatal (hell) being served as the prime phase of the storyline, which takes places in East Delhi, Delhi.

Cast and characters 
 Jaideep Ahlawat as Hathiram Chaudhary, a policeman
 Gul Panag as Renu Chaudhary, Hathiram's wife
 Bodhisattva Sharma as Siddharth Chaudhary, Hathiram's son
 Ishwak Singh as Imran Ansari, Hathiram's junior
 Neeraj Kabi as Sanjeev Mehra, a reputable journalist and news anchor
 Swastika Mukherjee as Dolly Mehra, Sanjeev's wife 
Niharika Lyra Dutt as Sara Matthews, a young journalist at Sanjeev's station who begins an affair with him
Abhishek Banerjee as Vishal "Hathoda" Tyagi, a notorious hitman and one of the four suspects arrested in the plot to murder Sanjeev Mehra 
Jagjeet Sandhu as Tope Singh ("Chaaku"), one of the four suspects who ran away from his village after murdering people of other castes 
 Aasif Khan as Kabir M, one of the four suspects who hides his Muslim faith from the public
 Mairembam Ronaldo Singh as Mary Lyngdoh ("Cheeni"), a transgender Nepali woman who is arrested along with the other three suspects 
 Vipin Sharma as DCP Bhagat, Hathiram's commanding officer
 Anurag Arora as SHO Virk, Hathiram's senior officer who previously trained under him
 Akash Khurana as Singh Saab, owner of Mehra's news station
 Manish Choudhary as Vikram Kapoor, a former rival of Mehra's who becomes his business partner
 Sandeep Mahajan as Delhi Intelligence officer Dahiya
 Rajesh Sharma as Gwala Gujjar, a tycoon who runs an organized crime ring out of Chittrakoot
 Sanjeeva Vats (voice) and Akshay Sharma (physical performance) as Donullia Gujjar, the shadowy, reclusive leader of Chittrakoot's organized crime ring and Gwala's brother; referred to as "Masterji" by his subordinates
 Anup Jalota as Balkishan Bajpayee, a prominent politician known for making inroads with Chittrakoot's Dalit community
 Anindita Bose as Chanda Mukherjee, Tope Singh's ex-girlfriend
 Asif Basra as Jai Malik
 V K Sharma as Old Sadhu
 Tushar Dutt as Raju Bhaiyya
 Amit Raj as journalist
 Manju Bahuguna as Hathoda Tyagi's mother
 Ajay Raju as Chaiwala

Episodes

Production

Development 
Paatal Lok is a police-based investigative thriller inspired by the traditional concepts of Svarga, Dharti and Paatal (heaven, earth and the hell), as metaphors for the different classes of India and the four estates. Vijay Subramanian, head of content for Amazon Prime Video India, announced the series, along with six Indian originals, at the Television Critics Association's press tour held at Los Angeles, California in February 2019. Writer Sudip Sharma eventually explained about the concept of the series, in a virtual meet stating "There are primarily three classes, the upper, middle and lower which I personally associated to Swarg Lok, Dharti Lok and Paatal Lok, essentially derived from heaven, earth and the netherworld. The thought behind the concept of the show was to explore these three classes that exist in our society in the form of an investigative thriller. “We wanted to explore the three layers from the eyes of the investigator; i.e. the protagonist of the show, who represents the earth, the victim represents the heaven, and the suspects come from Paatal Lok." The series marked Sudip's fourth collaboration with Anushka Sharma's production house Clean Slate Filmz (NH10, Phillauri and Pari), and the latter's debut in digital platforms. Anushka stated in an interview with Press Trust of India, that "I acknowledge that I have made a career and a name for myself, which is relevant. I want to be able to use the position that I've created with my hard work as an actor and be able to back the stories, people and talent."

Writing 
Sudip Sharma began writing Paatal Lok in the beginning of January 2017. For Sharma it was his maiden attempt at writing in long-form. The writing team also consisted of Hardik Mehta, Gunjit Chopra, Sagar Haveli who were also beginners in writing a series. Sharma wrote the first and last three episodes, while the remaining five were written by the other writers. All the writers did field research visiting places in Delhi and Uttar Pradesh in August 2017. The writing of the series took more than a year to complete, followed by research works and location scouting, and other process of pre-production. The show has two directors, Prosit Roy and Avinash Arun Dhaware, both directing different portions of the series. On hiring the directors, Sudip Sharma eventually stated "The minute both Prosit and Avinash were hired, I locked myself in a room with them for two weeks. Everyday, from 9 am to 7 pm, we would come in and go over the script again and again. In the process, we discussed how we would approach each scene, rewrote some parts, and changed character graphs. What that did was that by the end, the script was as much theirs as it was the writers."

Casting 
Sudip eventually wrote the script with the protagonist Jaideep Ahlawat in mind, stating that "he had a phenomenal presence". He gave the script to Jaideep, who read two or three episodes of the script at night, and Jaideep eventually met Sudip and Karnesh Sharma, the following day to read the entire script. Jaideep eventually stated in an interview with The Indian Express, that "What I found interesting was that the first impression you get of all the characters is in black and white — the criminals, the media and the cops. There’s a clear segregation. But as the story progresses, all the characters merge into each other in such a way that you don’t realise what’s right and what’s wrong."

Jaideep did not take any projects, in the intermediate time, despite being approached for Khaali Peeli (2020). While shooting for the series, he eventually increased his weight from 85 to 100 kilograms, as the show became physically demanding. While the series been primarily shot in Chitrakoot, Jaideep stated that the temperature ranged around 45-46 degrees, which eventually became difficult to shoot. Ishwak Singh, made his digital debut through the series, stated that "The shooting process in the digital world is quite different from that of the movie. While shooting for 'Paatal Lok', it was like shooting for three movies, as the makers had a bigger canvas to paint and a lot more to express and communicate." Gul Panag describes Renu Chaudhary, Hathiram's wife, as "the kind of middle-class wife whose aspirations are linked to her husbands".

Abhishek Banerjee also served as the casting director of the series, apart from playing the role of Hathoda Tyagi, the main antagonist in the series. Swastika Mukherjee, who played the role of Dolly Mehra, stated that he got a call from Banerjee, at October 2018, and sent her audition tape, which received a good feedback. She later came to Mumbai, for the audition process, which eventually worked well, although the actor joined the shoot, post completing her portions in Dil Bechara (2020). Although her character was not a lengthy one, she stated "length is not a prerequisite for me, and it would be stupid to choose roles depending on its length or dialogues. What makes sense is to understand the quality and also what you can bring to the table."

Filming 
Sudip eventually stated about having two directors to shoot the web series, stating it had as much to do with logistics as it had to do with artistry, He added "It’s physically very difficult for one director to shoot continuously for 100 days. In web-series, because of the format, directors come in late and then if you dump nine-ten episodes on one person, it’s very difficult for them to process this new world, these new characters and do complete justice to it." The series has been shot in 110 cities in India, with 70% of the shoot took place at actual locations, and the rest of the shoot was held at Mumbai. Shot mostly in major portions across North India, including Delhi and Uttar Pradesh,

Sudip chose locations with which he was familiar and had researched for his previous work. He chose to set the plot in Delhi, as Sudip stated "Its the apex of the Indian political scene and where the power lies. Also, most media channels operate out of Delhi. Another reason to consider Delhi was because of its location: it has the feel of a frontier town bordering to certain parts of Uttar Pradesh, Haryana and Rajasthan. These were aspects that we considered mainly because of what it is surrounded by and the representation in terms of power and national setting."

But in order to make the show as authentic, the makers decided to shoot some portions in Chitrakoot and Punjab for the landscape; with this Paatal Lok becoming the first web series to be shot at Chitrakoot. He stated "This is the first time any film, or series has been shot in Chitrakoot. When we had initially visited Chitrakoot for a scout, we weren’t aware of the terrain and the lack of infrastructure. We had to build the entire shooting eco-system from scratch. Luckily for us, a hotel had recently opened there, and that helped us a lot. The town is almost like a quaint forgotten town, something like Banaras but without the hustle and bustle."

Soundtrack 
Paatal Lok's original score and soundtrack were jointly composed by Naren Chandravarkar and British violist Benedict Taylor. The score received positive response from critics. In an article from Scroll.in titled Best of 2020 Music in Films and Web Series, Devarsi Ghosh stated "The gloomy landscape created by background score stylists Benedict Taylor and Naren Chandavarkar neither calls for attention nor can be ignored. The Paatal Lok score snakes through the roughly 360-minute series as a character in itself, dipping in and out of the sound design, hiding in the shadows, appearing only when necessary."

A promotional single "Toofan Main", sung by Prabh Deep and produced by Sez on the Beat, was released through YouTube on 22 May 2020, and received applause from audiences. The ending credits of the series features a reused rendition of the bhajan "Sakal Hans Mein Ram Viraje" by Prahlad Tipanya, famous for singing Kabir in the Malwi folk tradition. Tipaniya is named in the credits for the song and composition, while the lyrics are attributed to Guru Nanak. However, the series misattributed the credits for the song, which is written by Nanak Das, a renowned poet from Saurashtra. According to Niranjan Rajguru, a scholar and professor of Gujarati literature at Saurashtra University, "Few of Nanak Das’s compositions have been heard outside Gujarat, Sakal Hans is an exception as it was picked up by Prahlad Tipaniya who adapted it into Hindi."

Themes and analysis

Mythological Tropes 

Socio-economic divisions in India are metaphorically compared with the mythological Indian concepts of Svarga, Dharti and Paatal (heaven, earth and the hell). Delhi is used as the story-telling playground where Lutyens Delhi is heaven, Vasant Vihar and Noida is the earth while Jamna Paar in East Delhi is hell. The climax of the story is also based on the mythological fable of Yudhisthira's dog from the Mahabharata. In the closing moments, on an outing with his family, Hathiram Chaudhary spots a stray dog at a distance and tosses his ice-cream to him. The ending simply suggests that even after being neck-deep in hell, Hathi has now somehow found his way to "heaven". The dog simply serves as an allegory for Hathi's lack of selfishness and righteousness in a world where it's very easy to fall prey to corruption.

Didactic themes 
The show gives an insight into various forms of discrimination in India, through the perspectives of the four main antagonists – Kabir M, Tope Singh, Vishal "Hathoda" Tyagi and Ronaldo Singh (Cheeni). Kabir's backstory serves as a metaphor for religious fanaticism. Tope Singh's past revolves all around the toxic conflicts between the upper and lower castes. Cheeni's story brings out the issues of child abuse and discrimination against transgenders. Hathoda Tyagi's background gives insight into the abysmal state of women safety in rural India.

Politics 
According to Tanul Thakur of The wire; Paatal Lok begins with the excitement of a fantastic bildungsroman. Later, at the end of this traditional coming-of-age play, the protagonist comes to a critical realisation, discovering his True Self. However, because Hathi is about to dive into a macabre murky realm, that classic cliche is given a wonderful twist: what if you find the world but lose yourself? In addition to conveying a tight plot, the programme is astutely political. No matter how excellent an officer Ansari is, his last name follows him everywhere, subjecting him to harsh remarks — many of which are made by his colleagues. An extramarital romance between Sanjeev and his coworker Sara (Niharika Lyra Dutt), who is many years his junior, takes an unsettling turn, exposing his hidden hypocrisies. The petty power conflicts in the police station, particularly between Virk and Hathi, expose the Indian middle-innate class's cannibalism. And we witness a ruined India in the stories of Tope, Tyagi, Kabir, and Cheeni, where individuals are consumed and destroyed for no fault of their own, and where they in turn consume and destroy others.

Release 
Anushka Sharma released an announcement poster of the series, through the production house's Twitter account on 24 April 2020, and the teaser was unveiled the very same day. The first look poster was unveiled on 3 May 2020, and motion poster featuring Neeraj Kabi and Jaideep Ahlawat was released on the same day. The official trailer was unveiled through YouTube on 4 May 2020. The trailer received positive response from audiences, with The Indian Express stated that it is a "gripping crime drama". On 8 May 2020, posters featuring the five lead characters, were unveiled through social media platforms. The character trailer was unveiled on 9 May 2020. Paatal Lok was released through Amazon Prime Video on 15 May 2020, with the first episode being released earlier, on 14 May.

Reception

Critical response

India 
Anupama Chopra, editor-in-chief of Film Companion wrote "Paatal Lok is a tightly knit thriller with every episode ending on a cliffhanger, which forces you to keep bingeing. The suspense doesn’t flag but our perception of the characters shifts as the story unravels so that it becomes impossible to decide the good, bad and ugly." Harish Wankhede in his review for the Hindustan Times, stated that "In the plethora of dull and substandard Hindi content on the web today, Paatal Lok rises as a much-needed suspense thriller that is likely to be classified as a ‘classic’ soon." Saibal Chatterjee gave four out of five stars in his review for NDTV, and wrote "Paatal Lok is its own beast. It plunges, unflinching, into an abyss and shines a light on the darkness at its heart." Shubhra Gupta gave three-and-a-half out of five stars, in her review for The Indian Express and stated "Paatal Lok is fashioned as a crime thriller-cum-police procedural set mainly in Delhi, spinning off into several threads, some really solid, a few comparatively weak, but managing to keep its hold on us." Namrata Joshi of The Hindu wrote "There is a steady momentum, an unmistakable sense of force underlining the craft in Paatal Lok: from the cinematography to the acting to the atmospherics."

Renuka Vyahare of The Times of India gave four out of five and wrote "What essentially lies at the heart of Paatal Lok is a courageous screenplay that questions our society’s nature of burying the truth." Ananya Bhattacharya of India Today reviewed "Paatal Lok leaves you asking for more. About that though, looks like we will have to wait a while till a Season 2 happens, if at all it does." Swetha Ramakrishnan of Firstpost gave three out of five stars and stated "The primary problem with Paatal Lok is that it is trying too hard to be too many things: a thriller, a social commentary, an "edgy" take on new India and its fault lines." Nandini Ramanath of Scroll.in reviewed "Paatal Lok admirably resists the temptation to stretch into another season, but its denouement is hurried and unconvincing." Udita Jhunjhunwala of The Quint gave three out of five and wrote "Paatal Lok lands somewhere between Delhi Crime and Mirzapur but doesn't quite get the urgency of the police investigation of the former or the grit and messiness of the latter. The series builds in the occasional episodic hook and doesn't adequately cultivate an interest in or concern for the primary characters. But the textured topography, production, cinematography and some fine performances work hard to achieve a serviceable crime drama."

The New Indian Express, chief critic Shilajit Misra commented "The show takes its plot and characters from Tarun Tejpal’s novel The Story of My Assassins. There’s also a clear influence of Mindhunter and the methodical brilliance of its creator. But while both Tejpal’s book and the David Fincher series obsess over their respective killers, Paatal Lok takes a more glancing approach." Shubham Kulkarni of Koimoi gave four out of five and commented "Paatal Lok is brutal, not just in terms of violence on screen but the idea of it." Aishwarya Vasudevan of Daily News and Analysis gave four out of five and stated "Paatal Lok is not right to watch during the lockdown as you have no escapism to breathe fresh air. But once you hit 'play' button, there's no turning back, owing to cliffhangers in every episode. The end won't show the possibility of the second season, but it should happen as Hathi Ram deserves more adventures in his cop career which brings Swarg Lok, Dharti Lok and Paatal Lok together in an unexpected way." Priyanka Sinha Jha of News18 gave three-and-a-half out of five stating "Paatal Lok is certainly an important chronicling of the hellish journey of small-town characters who lived to tell the tale and one that makes for a compelling watch."

Overseas 
Meehika Barua of The Guardian stated "The stars of Paatal Lok speak out on the backlash surrounding their gritty portrayal of crime, corruption and caste inequalities. There is still a long way to go before the stars of India’s vibrant screen culture are able to speak out freely." Tanul Thakur of The Wire reviewed "Paatal Lok unfolds in two distinct parts. For the first six episodes, Hathi and Ansari follow one lead after the other; cogs in the system, they’re seeing what they’re shown. But the big picture doesn’t add up – a plot point that is also a comment on the nature of the Indian political and bureaucratic machinery – because there’s a bigger picture. The last three episodes make you an eager participant, dropping hints to unlock the what and why; the first curiosity is narrative, the second political. It’s this seamless blend that makes the series remarkable."

Audience reaction 
Paatal Lok opened to rave reviews, with many calling it India's best Hindi-language series. The day the series was released, Anurag Kashyap tweeted that Paatal Lok is "the best crime thriller to come out of this country," adding that "It comes from the understanding of Real India. The dark heart of India, the communal and casteist India." Filmstars Manoj Bajpayee and Alia Bhatt both took to Twitter to praise the show and the acting. The HuffPost India and The Indian Express ranked Paatal Lok as the Best Hindi Series of 2020. Variety magazine listed Paatal Lok as one of the best international TV shows of 2020.

Awards and nominations

Controversies
The series garnered controversy over the use of the slur "Nepali randi" in the second episode. Indra Hang Subba, a Member of Parliament from Sikkim, wrote to the Ministry of Information and Broadcasting about the matter. A complaint was filed by "All Arunachal Pradesh Gorkha Youth Association (AAPGYA)" to the National Human Rights Commission while a legal notice was also sent by the Lawyers Guild. Bharatiya Janata Party legislator Nand Kishore Gurjar filed a complaint related to "unauthorised use of his likeness" in the show as well as accused the show of being "anti-national" in numerous ways. The youth wing of the Bharatiya Gorkha Parisangh, Bharatiya Yuva Gorkha showed concern and demanded ban on the series.

Manjinder Singh Sirsa, former Akali Dal MLA and Delhi Sikh Gurudwara Prabandhak Committee president, called for a ban on the series for maligning Sikhs. He was referring to a scene where a Sikh man is shown raping a woman, as a few other men watch on. He tweeted that the series must be banned for maligning "religious harmony". Sirsa also appealed to information and broadcasting minister, Prakash Javadekar to ban the show and threatened legal action against Amazon Prime Video. A notice was filed against the makers at the Punjab and Haryana High Court in June 2020.

Notes

References

External links
 

Amazon Prime Video original programming
2020 Indian television series debuts
Indian crime television series
Fictional portrayals of the Delhi Police
Hindi-language web series
Sikhism-related controversies